Daria Khrystenko is a Ukrainian teacher, refugee and humanitarian, known for speaking widely about her experience of fleeing the conflict in Ukraine and rebuilding her life in Poland.

Biography 
Khrystenko was a teacher living in Kyiv until she fled the country with her mother and son due to the Russian invasion of Ukraine.

Khrystenko is fluent in Ukrainian, Russian, English and Polish.

Activism as a refugee 
After fleeing to Warsaw, in April 2022 Khrystenko signed up to be a teacher in Polish schools with the cash-for-work program sponsored by international humanitarian charity CARE International and the Polish Centre for International Aid. Khrystenko subsequently joined in helping Ukrainian refugees who had fled to Poland. Khrystenko has been acting as teacher for Ukrainian children adapting to Polish schooling, a translator between refugees and local charities, and a spokesperson for Ukrainian refugees and displaced people.

In June 2022, Khrystenko joined six other women and girls from around the world and wrote to G7 leaders ahead of the G7 Summit. Khystenko, citing her own experiencing as a refugee, called on leaders to "support vulnerable refugees from Ukraine without existing support systems" as well as refugees worldwide.

Khrystenko is interviewed regularly in the media about her experiences as a Ukrainian refugee. In February 2023, Khrystenko returned to her hometown in Ukraine to visit her father and grandmother for the first time since the conflict began. She was interviewed about this experience by Sophie Ellis-Bextor and Helen Pankhurst in the #Walk4Women podcast, produced by Stylist Magazine and CARE International.

See also 

 List of refugees
 2022 Ukrainian refugee crisis

References

External links 
 Daria Khystenko's full letter for G7 leaders on the Ukrainian refugee crisis

Ukrainian humanitarians
Refugees in Poland
Educators from Kyiv
People from Warsaw
Ukrainian refugees
Year of birth missing (living people)
Living people